is a 1956 black and white Japanese film drama directed by Yuzo Kawashima based on a novel by Jiro Osaragi and adapted for the screen by Kawashima and Shohei Imamura.

Plot 
In post-war Japan a middle aged family man connects with a woman from his past. He has two children, an arrogant son who is torn between his mistress and a new lover, and a disabled daughter who gets mixed up in the affair.

Availability 
In 2018 the Japanese film studio Nikkatsu and VOD platform MUBI collaborated on a retrospective of the work of Kawashima to be available to stream in the US to celebrate the 100th anniversary of his birth. The Balloon was among the films that were screened. In February 2020 the same retrospective was available to stream on MUBI in the Nordic countries.

Cast 
Masayuki Mori - Haruki Murakami
 Tatsuya Mihashi - Keikichi Murakami
 Mie Kitahara - Mikiko Mikihara
 Izumi Ashikawa - Tamako Murakami
 Michiyo Aratama - Kumiko Yamana
 Shirô Amakusa - Yamaguchi, photo shop owner

References

External links 
 

Japanese black-and-white films
Films directed by Yuzo Kawashima
1956 films
Nikkatsu films